

H

References